Bachuwapar is a Kasba/Town in Ambedkar Nagar district in the Indian state of Uttar Pradesh and is Subpost Office of Rajesultanpur.

Demographics
 India census, Bachuwapar had a population of 578. Males constitute 54% of the population and females 46%. Bachuwapar has an average literacy rate of 70%, higher than the national average of 59.5%: male literacy is 76%, and female literacy is 63%. In Bachuwapar, 15% of the population is under 6 years of age.

Nearby City 
 Rajesultanpur 0.5 km
 Tanda 50 km
 Azamgarh 30 km
 Gorakhpur 58 km
 Faizabad 120 km

References

Villages in Ambedkar Nagar district